Richard Lee Johnson Jr. (born December 12, 1963) is a former American football offensive tackle who played one game in the National Football League (NFL) for the Detroit Lions. He played college football for Grand Valley State.

Johnson was born on December 12, 1963, in Greenville Michigan. He attended Ionia High School near there, graduating in 1982. He subsequently played college football for the Division II Grand Valley State Lakers, and saw immediate playing time as a freshman. He earned letters in all four years with the school, graduating in 1986.

Johnson was not selected in the 1986 NFL Draft. In , after being out of the sport for a year, he was signed by the Detroit Lions during the 1987 NFL strike, in which teams hired replacement players. He appeared in one game with the team, a 19–16 win over the Green Bay Packers, before being released.

References

1963 births
Living people
Players of American football from Michigan
American football offensive tackles
Grand Valley State Lakers football players
Detroit Lions players
National Football League replacement players